Otho James Gilliland (June 19, 1892 – April 23, 1948) was an American football and basketball coach and a high school principal. He served as the head football coach (1922–1925) and head basketball coach (1922–1927) at Santa Barbara State College—now known as the University of California, Santa Barbara. During the 1914–15 academic year, Gilliland worked in the Botany Department at Stanford University. He served as the principal of Lompoc High School in Lompoc, California during the 1921–22 academic year.

References

1892 births
1948 deaths
American school principals
UC Santa Barbara Gauchos football coaches
UC Santa Barbara Gauchos men's basketball coaches
Stanford University staff